Lanna Commins (born November 3, 1983) is a Thai singer. Her mother, Soontaree Vechanont, is a notable folk singer in Thailand and her father is Australian. Commins spent her early years in Malaysia and Australia, before finally moving back to Chiang Mai, Thailand. She sang at Huan Soontaree, her mother's restaurant, where she attracted the interest of GMM Grammy. She has released three albums under the GMM Grammy record label, and two additional songs.

Discography
 2004 – Lanna Commins
 2005 – Yin Dee Pee Ra Gaa
 2006 – Happy Trip
 2007 – N/A

References

Lanna Commins
Lanna Commins
Lanna Commins
Living people
1983 births